Eduard Hagenbach-Bischoff (20 February 1833, in Basel – 23 December 1910, in Basel) was a Swiss physicist. The  Hagenbach-Bischoff quota (a voting system) is named after him.

The son of the theologian Karl Rudolf Hagenbach, he studied physics and mathematics in Basel (with Rudolf Merian), Berlin (with Heinrich Wilhelm Dove and Heinrich Gustav Magnus), Geneva, Paris (with Jules Célestin Jamin) and obtained his Ph.D. in 1855 at Basel. He taught at the Gewerbeschule (vocational school) in Basel and was after his habilitation, a professor of mathematics at the University of Basel for one year.
From 1863 to 1906 he was a full professor of physics at Basel (successor of Gustav Heinrich Wiedemann). In 1874 he became director of the institute of physics at the newly founded “Bernoullianum” in Basel, and from 1874 to 1879 he was president of the Swiss Academy of Sciences.

Hagenbach-Bischoff was involved in the popularisation of science, and at the “Bernoullianum” he gave more than 100 popular talks, such as one in 1896 on the newly discovered X rays.

Notes

References 
 Henri Veillon: Worte der Erinnerung an Eduard Hagenbach-Bischoff. Basel, 1911 (Verhandlungen der Naturforschenden Gesellschaft in Basel. Bd. XXII), pp. 46–53 (online).
 Friedrich Zschokke: Professor Eduard Hagenbach-Bischoff in: Basler Jahrbuch. 1912, pp. 146–191
 Monika Dommann: Durchsicht, Einsicht, Vorsicht. Eine Geschichte der Röntgenstrahlen 1896–1963. Chronos, Zürich, 2003 (PDF; 3,3 MB).

External links 
 
 History of the physics department of Basel University

1833 births
1910 deaths
19th-century Swiss  physicists